Jackman Park is a football ground in Limerick, Ireland. Located on the Lower Carey's Road, it was home to Limerick F.C. and is regularly used for various matches in Limerick, from schoolboy to women's international games. The ground's total capacity is 2,450 with a single 261-seat stand on the site of the former shed. It is situated next to Limerick railway station which is clearly visible from the shed side.

Crescent College owned the ground in the 1970s before moving out to Crescent College Comprehensive. During their ownership Old Crescent played there. It was known as Priory Park during this time. Floodlights were installed in 1989. West Ham United and Celtic have played at the venue in friendlies.

In 2021, Treaty United W.F.C. switched their home ground for Women's National League matches from Market's Field to Jackman Park.

Future
There has been much debate in recent times about the future of Jackman Park. Many would like a redevelopment of the ground while others feel it should be sold off as there is little space to develop. More recently Limerick 37 announced that plans were in place to build a seated stand at the Colbert Station side of the ground. This would probably be the most feasible option as there is little room elsewhere to construct a stand or terrace.

In 2008, the Limerick board announced their intentions to relocate the club to the Markets Field, the club's former home.

References

External links
League of Ireland Ground Guide

Association football venues in the Republic of Ireland
Limerick F.C.
Sports venues in County Limerick
Sports venues in Limerick (city)